Auxiliary members